John Lovelace  may refer to:

John Lovelace (died 1558), MP for Reading (UK Parliament constituency)
 John Lovelace, 2nd Baron Lovelace (1616–1670)
 John Lovelace, 3rd Baron Lovelace (c. 1640–1693)
 John Lovelace, 4th Baron Lovelace (d. May 6, 1709), Governor of the Province of New Jersey
 John Lovelace, 5th Baron Lovelace (d. May 1709), Baron Lovelace
 Jonathan Bell Lovelace of Capital Group Companies
 John Lovelace, Jr. of Capital Group Companies